Cove is an unincorporated community in Perry County, Pennsylvania, United States. It is a former borough and a railway junction interchanging point with the Norfolk Southern Pittsburgh Line. A post office existed here from 1870 to 1967.

Unincorporated communities in Perry County, Pennsylvania
Unincorporated communities in Pennsylvania